Steven Gore  is an American thriller writer and author of the Graham Gage (Final Target, 2010, Absolute Risk, 2010, and Power Blind, 2012) and Harlan Donnally (Act of Deceit, 2011, and A Criminal Defense, July 30, 2013) series published by HarperCollins . Gore is a former private investigator in the San Francisco Bay Area whose novels draw on his investigations of murder, fraud, money laundering, organized crime, political corruption, and drug, sex, and arms trafficking in Europe, Asia, and Latin America.

Bibliography

Graham Gage Series 
Final Target (2010)
Absolute Risk (2010)
Power Blind (2012)
White Ghost (2016))

Harlan Donnally Series 
Act of Deceit (2011)
A Criminal Defense (2013)
Night is the Hunter (February 2015)

Bibliography Details

The Graham Gage Thrillers

1. Final Target

 "Drawing on his expertise as a private investigator, Gore has written an exciting debut thriller that will both educate and entertain the reader. With his command of storytelling and insider's knowledge, Gore can go up against Nelson DeMille and Daniel Silva and come out a contender.” Library Journal Starred Review 

2. Absolute Risk

 "Masterful . . . Sharp, smart writing and convincing economic detail put this in the front rank of genre fiction." Publishers Weekly Starred Review 

3. Power Blind

 “In Power Blind, investigator Graham Gage gets engulfed in murder, corruption and the masking of a political money-laundering operation so big that it could actually topple the USA. Gripping and authentic -- the season's best.” San Jose Mercury News
 “(Power Blind’s) chief strength is its elaborate plot, coupled with Gore's personal understanding of the nature of PI work, as he provides readers with an intimate glimpse of the painstaking process by which Gage puts the pieces of the puzzle together—readers will walk away with the feeling that they've participated in an actual investigation.” Mystery Scene

The Harlan Donnally Novels

1. Act of Deceit

 "[Act of Deceit] is great, one of those stay-up-all-night-reading stories that will keep you on the edge of your seat . . . Gore’s style harkens back to the California noir of Ross MacDonald and the voice of his world-weary Lew Archer, though his plotting ultimately trends more toward the thriller genre than did MacDonald’s classic work. Gore gets where he is going with a series of twists, turns and revelations that keep the reader on board and frequently guessing; the climax is a satisfying one, promising great and interesting things to come from him in future volumes. " Bookreporter 

2. A Criminal Defense

 "A Criminal Defense is a compelling and strikingly intelligent thriller that crackles with legal and psychological authenticity. The story is as rich, gritty, and terrifically twisty as the San Francisco Bay Area that is its setting." Lou Berney, author of Whiplash River

References

External links 
 HarperCollins
 Author website

21st-century American novelists
American thriller writers
American crime writers
American male novelists
American mystery writers
Year of birth missing (living people)
Living people
21st-century American male writers